Steve Patterson is a retired American soccer forward.  He is the head coach of the Foothill High School girls’ soccer team.

Youth
In 1994, Patterson graduated from Foothill High School.  He attended Fresno State University, playing on the men's soccer team from 1994 to 1996.

Professional
In 1997, Patterson turned professional with the Colorado Foxes of the USISL A-League.  He finished the season with sixteen goals, placing him fourth on the league's scoring chart.  Patterson was also selected as Second Team All League.   At the end of the season, Patterson signed with the Colorado Rapids.  On November 6, 1997, the Chicago Fire selected Patterson in the 1997 MLS Expansion Draft.  The Fire waived him on March 1, 1998.  In 1998, Patterson moved to the Orange County Zodiac where he played until 2000.  In 2004, he spent the first half of the season with the Orange County Blue Star.

International
In 1994, Patterson played for the United States U-20 men's national soccer team at the 1995 CONCACAF U-20 Tournament.  Patterson and his teammates failed to qualify for the 1995 FIFA World Youth Championship.

External links
 Steve Patterson bio
 Benching gets Patterson’s attention

References

Living people
American soccer players
Colorado Foxes players
Fresno State Bulldogs men's soccer players
National Professional Soccer League (1984–2001) players
San Diego State Aztecs men's soccer players
Orange County Blue Star players
A-League (1995–2004) players
USL League Two players
United States men's under-20 international soccer players
Association football forwards
Year of birth missing (living people)